John Woodward Philip (26 August 1840 – 30 June 1900) was an officer in the United States Navy during the Civil War and Spanish–American War.

Biography
Born in Kinderhook, Columbia County, New York, Philip was appointed midshipman on 20 September 1856 and graduated from the Naval Academy on 1 June 1861.

Civil War
, attached to the South Atlantic Blockading Squadron. While serving in Chippewa, he was wounded during operations against Charleston, South Carolina, in July 1863. Philip served as executive officer of the steam sloop  under Commander Robert Townsend and assumed command upon Townsend's death from heat stroke in China on 15 August 1866. In 1877, he made a tour of the world in command of the Woodruff Scientific Expedition. Later he commanded the battleship  from 18 October 1897 to 29 August 1898.

Spanish–American War
During the Spanish–American War, his ship, with the cruiser , led the attack and silenced the fort on Cayo del Toro, Guantanamo Bay, on 15 June 1898. On 3 July 1898, in command of Texas, he participated in the Battle of Santiago de Cuba, in which Pascual Cervera y Topete's Spanish Fleet was destroyed off Santiago de Cuba. The poor devils are dying." He was advanced five numbers in grade on 10 August 1898 for eminent and conspicuous service in battle. From 3 September 1898 until 28 December 1898, he served as Commander of the 2nd Squadron, North Atlantic Fleet, flying his broad pennant in the armored cruiser .

Later career and death
Commencing 14 January 1899, he was in command of the New York Navy Yard and Naval Station, and was promoted to rear admiral on 3 March 1899. While serving in this duty, Admiral Philip died suddenly on 30 June 1900.

Namesake
Two destroyers have been named  in his honor.

See also

American Civil War
Spanish–American War

References

External links
 

1840 births
1900 deaths
Union Navy officers
American military personnel of the Spanish–American War
United States Navy admirals
People of New York (state) in the American Civil War